EOR could refer to:

 Earth Orbit Rendezvous, a proposed method for space missions to the Moon
 Electric orbit raising, a method in space technology of reaching higher orbits by means of electric propulsion
 Electro-optic rectification, a non-linear optical process
 Employer of record, a co-employment company
 Enhanced oil recovery, a term in petroleum production
 Epping Ongar Railway, a heritage railway in England
 European ordering rules, a standard to put words or names into sequence
 Exclusive or, the exclusive disjunction in logic
 Epoch of Reionization, a process that reionized matter in the universe.
 Economics of Religion, a field of study using economics to understand religion
 the IOC country code for the IOC Refugee Olympic Team at the 2020 Summer Olympics
 the character Eeyore from the Winnie the Pooh series.